Television in Iceland is currently composed of the public broadcasting service of RÚV, five free-to-view channels and a number of subscription channels provided by private broadcasters. Broadcasts began in 1955 when the American Forces Radio and Television Service (AFRTS) started an English-language television service broadcasting from Naval Air Station Keflavik, which operated until 2006. The first Icelandic-language television broadcasts started in September 1966 with the launch of RÚV, originally called Sjónvarpið ("The Television"). In 1986 the first privately owned TV station, Stöð 2 ("Channel 2"), began broadcasts. In recent years the emergence of foreign internet streaming services such as Netflix and Disney+ has seen shift from domestic providers provide similar on demand streaming services such as Síminn Premium and Stöð 2+.

Channels can be received via digital terrestrial DVB-T/T2, digital satellite DVB-S and through IPTV providers such as Síminn and Vodafone. Over-the-top streaming via domestic and foreign providers is also increasingly used.

The digital switchover occurred in 2015 when the last RÚV analog transmitter was shut down.

History 
The first television broadcasts commenced in 1955 by the American Forces Radio and Television Service (AFRTS) from the Naval Air Station Keflavik. A small transmitter broadcasting at 50W on the VHF band was not intended for the local population, but nevertheless locals began installing antennas and buying US television sets to receive the broadcasts. This created concern among some local politicians and prominent individuals, claiming it would weaken Icelandic language and culture. In 1961, the power was increased to 250W. Opposition to the American broadcasts were countered by 14,000 locals, who had come to enjoy the American programming, who signed a petition demanding it stay on air. Eventually, the AFRTS ceased its terrestrial broadcasts and built a private cable TV network in 1974.

The Icelandic state public broadcaster, RÚV, began transmissions in 1966 using PAL standards over the VHF band. Colour television broadcasts began in 1973. The first satellite ground station, Skyggnir, opened in 1981 which allowed the first international live TV events to be broadcast in 1986.

Stöð 2, the first private subscription TV service, began encrypted broadcasts in 1986 via terrestrial VHF which required the use of a decoder.

Throughout the late 1990s, local cable TV services began operating in some towns such as Keflavik, Hafnafjörður, Hella and Húsavik, offering international channels and programming. Síminn began installing cable TV networks in some areas of Reykjavík from 1997. As of 2021, most cable TV networks in Iceland are defunct and have been replaced by IPTV services.

Digital Island (now Vodafone Iceland), began over the air digital MMDS broadcasts in built up areas in 1999.

By the early 2000s, fiber and ADSL broadband became widely available, which led to the deployment of managed IPTV systems in 2004 by Síminn followed by Vodafone Iceland. This allowed many new domestic and international channels to become available to households. Iceland leads the world in IPTV subscriptions, with over 65% of households using such services in 2014

In 2007, RÚV began direct satellite TV broadcasts using the Thor 5 satellite over DVB-S, in order to service fishing fleets around Iceland and remote areas where the terrestrial network does not reach. Telenor runs the service by contract until 2028, this service is encrypted and is only available on request.

Digital terrestrial HDTV broadcasts commenced in 2014 following an agreement signed between public broadcaster RÚV and Vodafone Iceland on 27 March 2013 to install and run two new shared digital multiplexes using DVB-T/T2 over UHF bands, with 99.9% population coverage.

Analog transmissions ceased in 2015 and MMDS transmissions in 2016.

List of channels

Free-to-air channels
The following channels are available on DVB-T/T2 terrestrial television.

Free-to-view channels 
These channels are free to view via IPTV providers Siminn and Vodafone or through encrypted DVB-T broadcasts from Vodafone. Some channels provide OTT internet streaming via connected TV apps or their website.

Subscription channels

Defunct channels
Stöð 2 Krakkar
Stöð 3 - Icelandic general television channel, owned and operated by Sýn.
ÍNN - Owned and operated by Ingvi Hrafn Jónsson
iSTV
NFS, now a news service providing news for visir.is and television channels of 365
Skjár tveir, was meant to be an ad-free channel paid for by the viewers. It didn't go as planned and soon merged with Skjár einn.
Stöð 1, launched 29 Oct 2010. Entertainment channel, free to air, non-subscription. Reaches 98% of all households in Iceland.
Stöð þrjú, the old channel was used. But was bought quickly and shut down in the meaning, it was replaced by Stöð 2.
Skjár sport, showed Premier League matches for the seasons 2005–2006 and 2006–2007.
Stöð 2 Extra (previously called Sirkus) Entertainment channel previously available as free but is now only available as a complement to Stöð 2 subscription
Nova TV (previously called Sirkus and before that Popp Tíví), music videos – free channel
Fasteignasjónvarpið, a channel that offers real estate
Mikligarður, opened 15 March 2014 – closed 1 July 2014. Intended for ages 34+ with an emphasis on females. Programming was all domestic and included paid presentations. Broadcasts was 24/7 and in HD.

International channels available in Iceland
Additional international channels are available in Iceland through Vodafone Iceland and Síminn:

Overview of Icelandic TV

TV appearances

Test card for RÚV
The testcard of RÚV was the PM5544, introduced in the 1970s.

Text has been changed three times, minor change five times, returned two times
1970–1994 – "RUV – ISLAND"
1993 – "RÚV – ÍSLAND"
1995 – Added time and date
2000 – Remove time and date
Remove "ÍSLAND" and replace with the moving bar
2002 – Return the 1995 version
2006 – Return the 2000 version
2009 – Changed to PM5644

RÚV's testcard uses test tone but the last 15 minutes before programs start  plays classical music.

Closing and opening times
RÚV still closes down at night.

RÚV
1966–2018 opens at 16:30 for weekdays and closes at 00:00.
1966–2004 Weekends and holidays open at 9:00, though sometimes with midday break.
2004–2018 Weekends and holidays open at 8:00.
2018-present Opens at 13:00 for weekdays and closes at 01:00.
2018-present Weekends and holidays open from 07:15
Nightscreen during other times

Stöð 2
1986–1988 opens at 8:00 and close at 23:00.
1988–1995 opens at 6:00 and close at 0:00.
1995–present open 24 hours.

References

External links
 Sjónvarp Símans
 Icelandic Media Commission list of registered media (in Icelandic)
 Icelandic Media Commission list of licensed media (in Icelandic)